Anarchists of Good Taste is the fourth studio album and major label debut by Dog Fashion Disco. The album is often mistakenly referred to as the band's debut album and "Mushroom Cult", a collaboration with System of a Down frontman Serj Tankian, has been often misattributed to SOAD. The title for the album comes from a line in the song "Cartoon Autopsy". The album was rerecorded and released on December 7, 2018.

Track listing

2002 reissue
The album was reissued in 2002 in the U.S. with bonus tracks and a music video. The two bonus tracks are from the Mutilated Genitals EP.

Track 12 appears as bonus tracks on the European release.

Track Information
"Leper Friend", "9 To 5 At The Morgue", and "A Corpse is a Corpse" are re-recorded songs. All three appear on their third album, The Embryo's In Bloom.
"A Corpse is a Corpse" originally appeared on their debut, Erotic Massage.

Personnel
Todd Smith - Vocals
Greg Combs - Guitar
Stephen Mears - Bass
John Ensminger - Drums
Jeff Siegel - Keyboards

Additional Personnel
Matt Rippetoe - Saxophones, Flutes, Clarinet
Serj Tankian - Additional Vocals on "Mushroom Cult"
Drew Mazurek - Producer, Engineer, Mixer
Jake Mossman - Mixing Assistant Engineer
Tom Baker - Mastering
Jeff Cohen - Legal Representation
Paul Campanella - Cover Layout & Artwork
Dawn Paolini - Spitfire Art Coordinator
Steve Seabury - A&R

References

2001 albums
Dog Fashion Disco albums
Spitfire Records albums